Sukanya Kulkarni Mone is an Indian actress who mainly works in Hindi and Marathi films and serials.

Personal life 

Kulkarni was born in a Hindu family. She is married to Marathi veteran actor Sanjay Mone. The couple has one daughter, Julia Mone.

Filmography

Television

References

External links 

 Sukanya Kulkarni on IMDb

20th-century Indian actresses
21st-century Indian actresses
1968 births
Living people